Slottskajen (Swedish: "Palace Quay") is a quay and a street in Gamla stan, the old town in central Stockholm, Sweden.

Named after its location north of the Royal Palace, it stretches west from Skeppsbron and Strömbron to the square Mynttorget, overlooked by Lejonbacken, the ramps leading to the palace's northern entrance, and, passing along the canal Stallkanalen, is connected to the island Helgeandsholmen with The Riksdag by the bridge Norrbro.

The present name was made official in 1921, substituting the original proposal Slottsstranden ("Palace Shore").

Behind the five metres thick walls of the palace's northern wing, dating from the 13th century, is the Tre Kronor Museum, exhibiting objects from and models of the Tre Kronor Palace, destroyed by fire in 1697.

See also 
 List of streets and squares in Gamla stan

References

External links 
 hitta.se - Location map and virtual walk
 Royal Court - Tre Kronor Museum

Streets in Stockholm
Odonyms referring to a building